The Dominican leaf-toed gecko (Phyllodactylus hispaniolae) is a species of gecko. It is endemic to Hispaniola.

References

Phyllodactylus
Reptiles described in 1979